The following table indicates the party of elected officials in the U.S. state of Nebraska (including its time as a territory):
Governor
Lieutenant Governor
Secretary of State
Attorney General
State Auditor of Public Accounts
State Treasurer

The table also indicates the historical party composition in the:
State Legislature (technically non-partisan since 1937)
State delegation to the U.S. Senate
State delegation to the U.S. House of Representatives (including non-voting delegate)

For years in which a presidential election was held, the table indicates which party's nominees received the state's electoral votes.

Pre-statehood (1853–1866)

1867–1936

1937–present

References

See also
Politics in Nebraska

Politics of Nebraska
Government of Nebraska
Nebraska